Fossambault-sur-le-Lac is a city in the south part of Quebec, Canada, in La Jacques-Cartier Regional County Municipality, just north of Quebec City. It had a population of 2,327 as of the Canada 2021 Census. It is located near Saint-Joseph Lake.

Demographics 

Mother tongue:
 English as first language: 2.1%
 French as first language: 95.5%
 English and French as first language: 1.5%
 Other as first language: 0.9%

Places of interest
Station Touristique Duchesnay is one of the most attractive places of the town. The Jacques-Cartier River flows just nearby, and Route Fossambault links the town to Sainte-Catherine-de-la-Jacques-Cartier, where the Sainte Catherine's church is located. There is also a well-known hotel, called "Hotel de la Glace", with views overlooking the lake.

See also
List of cities in Quebec

References

Cities and towns in Quebec
Incorporated places in Capitale-Nationale